Bulletproof is the second studio album by American rapper Young Dolph, released on April 1, 2017 via Paper Route Empire.

Background
After evading questions about an incident where a reported 100 shots were fired (Dolph was not harmed), Young Dolph delivered his answer to the reports of the Charlotte shooting in the form of a new album, titled Bulletproof.

Singles
"That's How I Feel" was released as the album's first promotional single on March 10, 2017. The song features a guest verse from rapper Gucci Mane, while production was provided by Drumma Boy.

Track listing

Notes
The tracklist is a sentence about his incident.

Charts

References

2017 albums
Young Dolph albums
Empire Distribution albums
Albums produced by Metro Boomin
Albums produced by Zaytoven
Albums produced by Drumma Boy